The second season of CBS American television drama series Unforgettable premiered on July 28, 2013, and has 13 episodes. The first seven episodes of the season were aired between this date, and September 8, 2013.

Cast

Main cast
 Poppy Montgomery as Det. Carrie Wells (13 episodes)
 Dylan Walsh as Lt. Al Burns (13 episodes)
 Dallas Roberts as Eliot Delson (13 episodes)
 Jane Curtin as Dr. Joanne Webster (13 episodes)
 James Hiroyuki Liao as Det. Jay Lee (13 episodes)
 Tawny Cypress as Det. Cherie Rollins-Murray (13 episodes)

Recurring cast
 Stephen Kunken as Dale Parsons (2 episodes)
 Britt Lower as Tanya Sitkowsky (2 episodes)
 Adam Trese as Jay Krause (2 episodes)
 Sean Cullen as Gordon Frost (2 episodes)
 Makenzie Leigh as Celine Emminger (2 episodes)
 Emily Shaffer as Andrea Weston (2 episodes)

Production
On May 13, 2012, CBS confirmed the cancellation of the series. A group of fans organized to try to save the series from cancellation. Their efforts included teaming up to create a campaign entitled "Save Unforgettable" and persuade other networks to pick up the series. TNT and Lifetime soon expressed interest in picking up the show before ultimately passing on the series. However, on June 29, 2012, CBS confirmed that Unforgettable would return for a second season in the summer of 2013 with an order for 13 episodes. The September 8 episode served as the summer finale, with the remainder of the season returning in January in Europe and on April 4, 2014 in the United States.

Episodes

Notes

Ratings

References

2013 American television seasons
2014 American television seasons
2